Kobbergrund is a shoal in the Kattegat 11 kilometers (7 miles) East South East of the Danish island of Læsø, lying close to the main shipping lanes from the south.

Shipwrecks
It is the site of several shipwrecks, including the Russian ship Baron Stieglitz in 1840 and the earlier Printz Friderich, a Danish ship-of-the-line in 1780.  The wreck of the latter was newly discovered in 2018 by a team using modern survey equipment. The shoal was known in English as "Kobber Ground".

Survey
The survey of Danish coasts and waters begun in 1791, and restarted after a hiatus in 1827, saw the first general chart for the Kattegat published in 1844.
The vessel was schooner-rigged, painted with a white cross on each site, and carried three lights on her mast.

Lightships
The Danish government stationed lightships at Kobbergrund from 1853 to 1908.

References

Shoals of Europe
Kattegat
Sandbanks of the North Sea